Elsie Smith  (8 September 1881 – 4 May 1968) was a New Zealand nurse, Anglican deaconess and missionary. She was born in Kingstone Lisle, Berkshire, England, on 8 September 1881. She lived and worked in Whanganui River settlements for 33 years.

In the 1955 Queen's Birthday Honours, Smith was appointed a Member of the Order of the British Empire, recognising her service as a nurse in the Maori Anglican Mission on the Whanganui River.

References

1881 births
1968 deaths
New Zealand Anglican clergy
New Zealand nurses
Anglican missionaries in New Zealand
English emigrants to New Zealand
New Zealand women nurses
Female Christian missionaries
English Anglican missionaries
New Zealand Members of the Order of the British Empire